Abul Hossain Khan is a Bangladesh Nationalist Party politician and the former Member of Parliament of Barisal-6.

Career
Khan was elected to parliament from Barisal-6 as a Bangladesh Nationalist Party candidate in 2001.

References

Bangladesh Nationalist Party politicians
Living people
8th Jatiya Sangsad members
People from Barisal District
Year of birth missing (living people)